Pristimantis achatinus, also known as Cachabi robber frog or pastures rainfrog, is a species of frog in the family Strabomantidae.
It is found from eastern Panama through Colombia to western Ecuador.
Its natural habitats are both lowland and montane habitats: forest clearings, road cuts in forest, and banana, cacao and coffee plantations, as well as in forested areas. It is mostly terrestrial, sometimes occurring off the ground in vegetation. It is a very common frog.

References

achatinus
Amphibians of Colombia
Amphibians of Ecuador
Amphibians of Panama
Amphibians described in 1898